Best Actor in a Supporting Role may refer to:

 AACTA Award for Best Actor in a Supporting Role
 BAFTA Award for Best Actor in a Supporting Role
 Zee Cine Award for Best Actor in a Supporting Role – Male
 Zee Cine Award for Best Actor in a Supporting Role – Female

See also
 Best Supporting Actor (disambiguation)
 List of awards for supporting actor